The following lists events that happened during 1979 in Laos.

Incumbents
President: Souphanouvong 
Prime Minister: Kaysone Phomvihane

Events

Births
9 September - Phoutlamphay Thiamphasone

Deaths
date unknown - Touby Lyfoung

References

 
Years of the 20th century in Laos
Laos
1970s in Laos
Laos